The textile museum in Česká Skalice is the only Czech museum specialized in the history of textile production. Its displays and collections represent a unique body of work reflecting the development of the textile industry, especially cloth printing, in the Czech Republic and abroad. The museum, a branch of the Museum of Decorative Arts in Prague, holds regular exhibitions.

Textile exhibitions

Cotton-production in Eastern Bohemia
Collaboration of artists with textile printing
History of textile production in the Czech lands until the end of the 18th century
History of textile printing and auxiliary technologies in manufactories and factories

See also
The Chateau at Klášterec nad Ohří
Josef Sudek Gallery
The Chateau at Kamenice nad Lipou

External links

 Official site of the Museum of Decorative Arts in Prague

Museums in the Hradec Králové Region
Textile museums
Náchod District